The Union of Slavic Churches of Evangelical Christians and Slavic Baptists of Canada is a religious and charitable organization. It was incorporated in 1963 and is headquartered in Toronto, Ontario, Canada. In 1995, the Union had about 500 members in 11 churches.

According to the Canadian Revenue Agency, the organization's ongoing programs are providing spiritual and financial support to Slavic Baptist churches and running a summer camp.

See also
 Fellowship of Evangelical Baptist Churches in Canada
 Ukrainian Evangelical Baptist Convention of Canada

References

External links 
 Union of Slavic Churches of Evangelical Christians and Slavic Baptists of Canada - Canadian Charity Listings Detail Page

Christian organizations established in 1963
Baptist denominations established in the 20th century
Slavic diaspora in Canada
Baptist denominations in North America
Baptist Christianity in Canada